Eddie Keith Bonine (born June 6, 1981) is an American former professional baseball pitcher. He played in Major League Baseball (MLB) with the Detroit Tigers from 2008 to 2010.

College career
Bonine was born in Columbus, Georgia, but moved to Glendale, Arizona, where he attended Mountain Ridge High School. After graduating he attended Glendale Community College 1999–2001. In his second year he was named to the Arizona Community College Athletic Conference's First Team. At Glendale, he attracted the attention of the Arizona Diamondbacks, who in 2001 drafted him in the 20th round, 608th pick overall. Bonine did not sign, and transferred to Washington State University for the 2001–2002 season, going 8–8 with a 6.36 earned run average (ERA) and being named an honorable mention for the All-Pac-10 team.

For his senior year (2002–2003), Bonine transferred to the University of Nevada, Reno where he went 5–6 with a 5.84 ERA. Following graduation, the San Diego Padres drafted Bonine in the 23rd round; 671st overall. This time Bonine signed and was assigned to the Single-A Eugene Emeralds.

Minor leagues

San Diego Padres (first stint)
Bonine made 31 appearances with Eugene in a relief role, going 1–2 with a 3.78 ERA and 12 saves. At the end of the season, Bonine was named to the Northwest League's All-Star team. For 2004, the Padres sent Bonine to the Single-A Fort Wayne Wizards, where he posted a 1.98 ERA over five starts before being promoted to the Single-A Lake Elsinore Storm. There he started 21 games with mixed results: a 5–10 record and an ERA over 5. Returning to the Storm for the 2005 season, Bonine went 5–6 with an ERA of 6.47, but pitched a gem in the post-season: a 4–1 win over the San Jose Giants in which he threw 8 innings. The Padres assigned Bonine to the Triple-A Portland Beavers, where he made one appearance. In December 2005, the Detroit Tigers selected Bonine in the Rule 5 draft and he was sent to the Single-A Lakeland Tigers.

Detroit Tigers
Bonine spent the 2006 season in Lakeland where he pitched both as starter and reliever. Over the course of 42 appearances he amassed a 4–5 record, plus one save, with an ERA of 3.90. Pleased, the Tigers promoted Bonine to the Double-A Erie SeaWolves for the 2007 season, where he posted a 14–5 record with a 3.90 ERA. His walks-per-9 innings average (1.34) led the Eastern League. For the 2008 season, the Tigers promoted Bonine to the Triple-A Toledo Mud Hens, where got off to a 9–2 start before being called up to the majors to replace struggling pitcher Dontrelle Willis and made his major league debut on June 14, 2008, against the Los Angeles Dodgers. The Tigers optioned Bonine back to Erie after a July 9, 2008, start against the Cleveland Indians.

Bonine started the 2009 with the Tigers, but was sent down to Mud Hens on April 27 to make room for Joel Zumaya, who returned from the disabled list. In four appearances Bonine posted a 9.00 ERA but did not earn a decision. In Toledo Bonine got off to a strong start, going 0–0 with a 1.88 ERA over his first four starts. At the end of the season, he filed for free agency.

Philadelphia Phillies

On November 12, 2010, Bonine signed a minor league deal with the Philadelphia Phillies.

Arizona Diamondbacks

On November 6, 2012, Bonine signed a minor league deal with the Arizona Diamondbacks. He was released on April 20, 2013.

San Diego Padres (second stint)

On April 20, 2013, Bonine signed a minor league contract with the San Diego Padres.

References

External links

1981 births
Living people
Arizona League Padres players
Baseball players from Columbus, Georgia
Detroit Tigers players
Erie SeaWolves players
Eugene Emeralds players
Fort Wayne Wizards players
Lake Elsinore Storm players
Lakeland Tigers players
Lehigh Valley IronPigs players
Leones del Caracas players
American expatriate baseball players in Venezuela
Major League Baseball pitchers
Nevada Wolf Pack baseball players
Peoria Saguaros players
Portland Beavers players
Reno Aces players
San Antonio Missions players
Sportspeople from Glendale, Arizona
Toledo Mud Hens players
Tucson Padres players
University of Nevada, Reno alumni
Washington State Cougars baseball players